America (pronounced "America Cubed") is the name of both a syndicate that vied for the America's Cup in 1992 and 1995 and its boats.

1992 Cup victory

The program was operated by Bill Koch and Harry "Buddy" Melges in the 1992 America's Cup.  After winning the Defender Series, America defeated the Italian challenger Il Moro di Venezia to successfully defend the Cup.

The yacht, named America³, was built by Goetz Custom Sailboats Inc. in Rhode Island and the carbon fiber mast package was built by the Offshore Spars Co. in Michigan.

1995 Cup defense
In 1995, Bill Koch revamped the program to begin the first nearly all-female, America's Cup boat. America's successor, Mighty Mary, was on her way to a race-off with Young America, the boat of the third syndicate that year, to determine who went through to the 1995 America's Cup, in the lead of what ended up being the last race of the Defender Series over Stars & Stripes.  But with a commanding lead of nearly 5 minutes, Dave Dellenbaugh (the only man on the otherwise all-female crew) committed a crucial tactical error and Stars & Stripes skipper Dennis Conner made a series of moves to beat Mighty Mary to the finish line by scant seconds.  After winning the Defender Series, Conner opted to use Young America to defend the cup, losing to Team New Zealand, 5-0.

1995 team
 Jenifer (J.J.) Isler (San Diego, California)
 Ann Nelson (San Diego, California)
 Elizabeth (Lisa) Charles (Provincetown, Rhode Island)
 Hannah Swett (Jamestown, Rhode Island)
 Joan Lee Touchette (Newport, Rhode Island)
 Shelley Beattie (Malibu, California)
 Stephanie Armitage-Johnson (Auburn, Washington)
 Dawn Riley (Detroit, Michigan)
 Merritt Carey (Tenants Harbor, Maine)
 Amy Baltzell (Wellesley, Massachusetts)
 Courtenay Becker (The Dalles, Oregon)
 Sarah Bergeron (Middletown, New Jersey)
 Sarah Cavanagh (Denver, Colorado)
 Leslie Egnot (born in South Carolina but moved to Auckland, New Zealand)
 Christie Evans (Marblehead, Massachusetts)
 Diana Klybert (Annapolis, Maryland)
 Susanne (Suzy) Leech Nairn (Annapolis, Maryland)
 Linda Lindquist (Chicago, Illinois)
 Stephanie Maxwell-Pierson (Somerville, New Jersey)
 Jane Oetking (Rockwell, Texas)
 Merritt Palm (Fort Lauderdale, Florida)
 Katherine (Katie) Pettibone (Coral Gables, Florida)
 Marci Porter (Oarton, Virginia)
 Melissa Purdy (Tiburon, California)

References

 

America's Cup teams
International America's Cup Class
America's Cup defenders
San Diego Yacht Club